Erechthias hemiclistra is a species of moth in the family Tineidae. It was described by Edward Meyrick in 1911. This species is endemic to New Zealand. Entomologist George Hudson reared this moth from caterpillars and cocoons in the flower stems of Chionochloa conspicua at Makara. The adults emerged in November and February. The food of the larvae of this species is apparently dead woody fibre.

References

External links
Image of lecotype specimen of Erechthias hemiclistra

Moths described in 1911
Erechthiinae
Moths of New Zealand
Endemic fauna of New Zealand
Taxa named by Edward Meyrick
Endemic moths of New Zealand